The 1990 San Marino Grand Prix (formally the 10o Gran Premio di San Marino) was a Formula One motor race held on 13 May 1990 at Imola. It was the third race of the 1990 Formula One World Championship.

The race was won by Italian driver Riccardo Patrese, driving a Williams-Renault. It was Patrese's third Grand Prix victory, and his first since the 1983 South African Grand Prix.  Patrese holds the record for the longest waiting period between two Grand Prix wins, at 6 years, 6 months and 28 days. The record of most Grands Prix between wins was also broken and would be retained by Patrese until the 2018 United States Grand Prix when Kimi Räikkönen took the record. Austrian driver Gerhard Berger finished second in a McLaren-Honda, with Patrese's compatriot Alessandro Nannini third in a Benetton-Ford.

Background
In the run-up to the first European race of the 1990 World Championship, there were a few changes to the grid. Brabham replaced Swiss driver Gregor Foitek with Australian driver David Brabham, the youngest son of team founder Sir Jack Brabham. Foitek moved over to the troubled Onyx team (part-run by his father Karl), replacing Stefan Johansson, who was unhappy at the way the team was being run. Meanwhile, Emanuele Pirro returned to the Dallara team, having missed the first two races of the season due to hepatitis. Several teams unveiled new cars, with the Tyrrell 019 – designed by Harvey Postlethwaite – drawing much attention as the first F1 car to sport a "high-nose" design with downward-extending supports for the front wing.

Qualifying

Pre-qualifying report
The Friday morning pre-qualifying session took shape very soon into the one-hour session, after both AGS cars dropped out almost immediately. The team had brought their new JH25 car to this race, but Yannick Dalmas was withdrawn due to a hand injury he suffered in a testing accident, and Gabriele Tarquini's car failed on its first lap with a fuel pressure issue. This left seven cars in the session, three of which were uncompetitive.

The Larrousse-Lola team also brought a new car to the Grand Prix, the LC90. As at the previous race in Brazil, they finished first and second, with Éric Bernard nearly a second faster than his team-mate Aguri Suzuki. The updated Osella FA1ME of Olivier Grouillard was third fastest, a fraction ahead of Roberto Moreno in the EuroBrun.

Apart from the AGS cars, the other runners who failed to pre-qualify included Bertrand Gachot in the Coloni, which, despite revised aerodynamics and a 23kg weight reduction, was still seven seconds away from Bernard's time. Even slower was Claudio Langes in the other EuroBrun, down in sixth place. At the Life team, Bruno Giacomelli drove the L190 for the first time, having replaced Gary Brabham. A drivebelt failed on the Italian's very slow first lap, and the car did not reappear for the rest of the session.

Pre-qualifying classification

Qualifying report
In practice, Benetton's Alessandro Nannini and Minardi's Pierluigi Martini both crashed heavily, Martini cracking his heel and withdrawing from the race as a result. 

In the qualifying sessions, the McLarens filled the front row, with Ayrton Senna on pole and team-mate Gerhard Berger alongside him. The two Williams were on the second row with Riccardo Patrese ahead of Thierry Boutsen, while the two Ferraris made up the third row, Nigel Mansell ahead of Alain Prost. The top ten was completed by the Tyrrell of Jean Alesi, the Benettons of Nelson Piquet and Nannini, and the Lotus of Derek Warwick.

Qualifying classification

Race

Race report
Pirro, who had qualified 21st, started from the back of the grid after his Dallara stalled at the start of the formation lap. At the start, Senna led away from Berger while Boutsen got ahead of Patrese. At Tamburello, Mansell ran wide and kicked up dust, which caused the Leyton House of Ivan Capelli and the second Tyrrell of Satoru Nakajima to collide with each other, while at Tosa Martin Donnelly spun his Lotus, narrowly avoiding other drivers. Meanwhile, Boutsen got past Berger but was unable to close on Senna. The order remained the same until lap 3 when Senna pulled off with a broken wheel rim, allowing Boutsen to take the lead with Berger close behind. Further back, Alesi collided with Piquet at Tosa; both drivers continued.

Boutsen led until his Renault engine blew on lap 17, which left Berger ahead of Patrese and Mansell. The Englishman passed Patrese going into Tosa, much to the delight of the Italian fans. Mansell continued to charge, despite being hit by Andrea de Cesaris while trying to lap him and challenged Berger for the lead. On the run up to Villeneuve, Mansell tried to go around the outside, but Berger closed the door, causing Mansell to spin dramatically. The Englishman avoided hitting anything and ended up pointing in the right direction, he continued in second place, however, dirt and debris had entered Mansell's engine, causing it to overheat and blow-up a few laps later.

Mansell's demise left Berger ahead of Patrese, who went through into the lead on lap 51. Nannini and Prost battled over third place, with Nannini winning out. Patrese duly won his first race since the 1983 South African Grand Prix, leading home Berger, Nannini, Prost, Piquet, and Alesi. With 98 races between victories, Patrese claimed the record for most starts between wins - a record that would be taken 28 years later by Kimi Räikkönen, who started 113 races between winning the 2013 Australian Grand Prix and the 2018 United States Grand Prix.

Race classification

Championship standings after the race

Drivers' Championship standings

Constructors' Championship standings

References

San Marino Grand Prix
San Marino Grand Prix
San Marino Grand Prix
May 1990 sports events in Europe